Pachak Pata (Quechua pachak, pachaq one hundred, pata step, bank of a river, "one hundred steps", Hispanicized spelling Pachacpata) is a mountain in the Wansu mountain range in the Andes of Peru, about  high. It is situated in the Apurímac Region, Antabamba Province, Antabamba District. Pachak Pata lies west of Muntirayuq and northwest of Saywa Punta.

References 

Mountains of Peru
Mountains of Apurímac Region